Casino Classics is the debut album by the British indie pop band Comet Gain, released in 1995. The liner notes were provided by Television Personalities frontman Dan Treacy.

Critical reception
Tiny Mix Tapes stated that Casino Classics had "alternate touches of twee and jangly power pop." AllMusic wrote that the "combination of shambling sounds and charming songwriting makes for a rather lovable album."

Track listing

References

1995 albums
Comet Gain albums